Chikki is a traditional Indian sweet (brittle) generally made from nuts and jaggery/sugar. There are several different varieties of chikki in addition to the most common groundnut (peanut) chikki. Each variety of chikki is named after the ingredients used, which include puffed or roasted Bengal gram, sesame, puffed rice, beaten rice, or khobra (desiccated coconut), and other nuts such as almonds, cashews and pistachios. 

In regions of North India, especially Bihar and Uttar Pradesh, this sweet is called layiya patti. In Sindh and Sindhi regions of India, it is called layee or lai and in other north Indian states, it is also known as gajak or maroonda. In Bangladesh, West Bengal and other Bengali-speaking regions, it is known as gur badam. In the South Indian states of Telangana and Andhra Pradesh, it is called palli patti. In Kerala it is called Kappalandi muthai. In Tamil Nadu it is called kadalai mittai. In Karnataka it's called Kadale Mittai. Similar dishes are also very popular in Brazil, where it is known as pé-de-moleque, in Paraguay, where it is called ka'i ladrillo, and in Thailand, where it is called thua tat.

Ingredients

Chikkis are made using a combination of ingredients. Special chikkis are made out of cashews, almonds, pistachios, and also sesame seed. Though jaggery is the usual sweetener material, sugar is sometimes used as the base. It is a very popular sweet item in both rural and urban South Asia. In the South Indian state of Tamil Nadu, preparation often takes place with a larger proportion of nuts to jaggery. In several states, chikkis in both square and round forms are available.

Preparation
The preparation of chikkis consists of first preparing the hot jaggery syrup with a minimum of water, adding nuts to the syrup to coat them (with the syrup) and then transferring the nuts to a wooden mould, then rolling them to a thickness of about 6–8 mm using a wooden roller, then placing into a steel plate for cooling, cutting into slabs, and packing. In homes, smaller quantities are hand rolled with wooden rollers.

Most popular chikkis are sourced from the Indian towns of Bhuj in Gujarat;  Kovilpatti in Tamil Nadu; Standard Cold Pressed Oil Madurai, Palakkad , Central Travancore, Kannur, Cherthala in Kerala, Lonavala, Matheran, Mahabaleshwar, Panchgani, and Karjat in Maharashtra. In Mumbai, a variety of chikki is made using rajgira (amaranth).

See also
 Gajak, a similar candy with sesame seeds
 Kovilpatti
 Lonavala chikki
 Peanut brittle, a similar candy with a lower proportion of nuts
 Gozinaki
 List of peanut dishes
 Tameletjie
 Alegría (Mexican candy)
 Pé-de-moleque

References

External links
IndiaCurry.com Chikki and Recipes 
Singada Chikki recipe on Recidemia
 Indian Chikki Recipes

Indian confectionery
Indian desserts
Lonavala-Khandala
Maharashtrian cuisine
Peanut dishes
Bengali cuisine
Nut confections